Downs House may refer to:

N. C. Downs House, Kenton, Delaware, listed on the NRHP in Kent County, Delaware
Thomas Downs House, Charlestown, Indiana, listed on the NRHP in Clark County, Indiana
Denver Downs Farmstead, Anderson, South Carolina, listed on the NRHP in Anderson County, South Carolina
Charles Downs II House, Marlowe, West Virginia, listed on the NRHP in Berkeley County, West Virginia

See also
Downe House and Down House (disambiguation)